Peden Cliffs is a line of cliffs, 6 nautical miles (11 km) long, breached near the center by Rhodes Icefall. The cliffs border the north side of Garfield Glacier in the west part of McDonald Heights, Marie Byrd Land. Mapped by United States Geological Survey (USGS) from surveys and U.S. Navy air photos, 1959–65. Named by Advisory Committee on Antarctic Names (US-ACAN) for Irene C. Peden, ionospheric physicist who made investigations on electrical measurements of the ice sheet near Byrd Station, 1970–71.

References

Cliffs of Marie Byrd Land